Mount Herbert, also named Boundary Peak 172, is a mountain in Alaska and British Columbia, located on the Canada–United States border, and part of the Southern Icefield Ranges of the Saint Elias Mountains. It was named in 1923 for Right Honorable Sir Michael Henry Herbert (1857-1903), British Ambassador to the United States during the early stages of Alaska Boundary Tribunal.

See also
List of Boundary Peaks of the Alaska-British Columbia/Yukon border

References

Mountains of Alaska
One-thousanders of British Columbia
Saint Elias Mountains
Canada–United States border
International mountains of North America
Mountains of Yakutat City and Borough, Alaska